Live In Moscow is a live concert DVD by the Red Elvises. The concert was recorded May 31, 2006 at Club Apelsin in Moscow, Russia.

Track listing 

 "Love Rocket"
 "Ticket to Japan (Live 8)"
 "Strip Joint Is Closed"
 "Lambada"
 "Blue Moon" (Rodgers/Hart)
 "I Wanna See You Bellydance"
 "Closet Disco Dancer"
 "Cosmonaut Petrov"
 "My Love Is Killing Me"
 "Jerry's Got a Squeezebox"
 "Juliet"

BONUS MATERIAL:

 "Venice USA" (slide show)
 "I Wanna See You Bellydance" (music video)
 "Love Pipe" (music video)

Personnel 

 Igor Yuzov - guitar, vocals
 Oleg Bernov - bass, vocals
 Elena Shemankova - keyboard, accordion
 Artiom Zhuliev - sax
 Sergei Kalinin - drums

2006 live albums
Red Elvises albums